Lesbian, gay, bisexual, and transgender (LGBT) persons in the U.S. state of Colorado enjoy most of the same rights as non-LGBT people. Same-sex sexual activity has been legal in Colorado since 1972. Same-sex marriage has been recognized since October 2014, and the state enacted civil unions in 2013, which provide some of the rights and benefits of marriage. State law also prohibits discrimination on account of sexual orientation and gender identity in employment, housing and public accommodations and the use of conversion therapy on minors. In July 2020, Colorado became the 11th US state to abolish the gay panic defense.

Colorado is frequently referred to as one of the most LGBT-friendly states in the Mountain West. The LGBT think tank Movement Advancement Project ranks Colorado second in the region for LGBT rights legislation, behind Nevada. 2019 polling from the Public Religion Research Institute showed that 77% of Colorado residents supported anti-discrimination legislation protecting LGBT people.

History and law regarding same-sex sexual activity

The Arapaho, who now live on the Wind River Indian Reservation in Wyoming, recognize male-bodied individuals who act, behave and live as women, referred to as haxu'xan. The haxu'xan, like women, are traditionally in charge of food preparation and dressing hides to make clothing and bedding. They form a "third gender" in Arapaho society, and can even marry men. The Arapaho believe their gender is "a supernatural gift from birds and animals".

In 1860, sodomy was made illegal in Colorado, then the Jefferson Territory, under its first criminal code, which indirectly prohibited sodomy by expressly recognizing common law, under which the maximum penalty for sodomy was death. In 1861, the U.S. Congress created the Colorado Territory, whose government enacted a criminal code that punished sodomy (as defined by common law) with penalties ranging from one year to life in prison. In 1922, the Colorado Supreme Court ruled that the ban did not prohibit fellatio (oral sex), even though the court felt that the behavior was "more vile and filthy than sodomy". The law was revised in 1939 to expressly cover anal intercourse and oral sex, whether heterosexual or homosexual, and the maximum penalty was reduced to fourteen years. In 1953, Colorado enacted a psychopathic offender law that provided for indefinite institutionalization for committing sex crimes, thus putting homosexuals in the same category as rapists and child molesters. The law was struck down by the U.S. Supreme Court in 1967 in Specht v. Patterson, holding that the law was "unconstitutional because the defendants were not afforded basic due process of law in the proceedings". In 1970, the Colorado Supreme Court ruled that the sodomy ban also included cunnilingus.

In 1971, Colorado revised its penal code and decriminalized sodomy in cases that involved non-commercial, private acts between consenting adults. At the same time, it instituted a public indecency law that banned public displays of affection between same-sex couples. The Colorado Supreme Court struck down that statute in 1974.

Recognition of same-sex relationships

In 1975, the Boulder County Clerk issued marriage licenses to several same-sex couples after the local district attorney interpreted Colorado's statutes, which used the phrase "any two persons", to be gender-neutral with respect to marriage. State Attorney General J.D. MacFarlane issued a contrary opinion that those marriages were invalid. When one of those married in Boulder tried to use it to sponsor his husband for immigration purposes, he lost his case, Adams v. Howerton, in federal court. In 2016, U.S. Citizenship and Immigration Services reversed its decision from 1975 and granted permanent residency status to Anthony Sullivan, based on his marriage to Richard Adams in Boulder on April 21, 1975.

In 1996, Governor Roy Romer vetoed legislation which would have banned recognition of same-sex marriages. In his notice to the General Assembly, Governor Romer wrote "It is one thing to believe, as I do, that marriage is for the union of a man and woman. It is quite another to believe that committed same sex relationships do not exist and should not be recognized by society." In 2006, a state referendum added language to the Colorado Constitution that restricted marriage and common law marriage to couples of different sexes, without mentioning civil unions or domestic partnerships.

In April 2009, Colorado enacted a designated beneficiaries law, effective July 1, that allowed anyone to make a same-sex partner the beneficiary of insurance, inheritance, hospital visitations, funeral arrangements and death benefits, and other important matters.

In 2011 and 2012, state lawmakers attempted but failed to pass an act formally recognizing civil unions, though Governor John Hickenlooper endorsed the legislation in his 2012 State of the State address. In March 2013, both houses of the Democratic-controlled General Assembly passed legislation establishing civil unions that provide rights comparable to those provided to opposite-sex married couples and Governor Hickenlooper signed the bill into law on March 21, 2013. The law went into effect on May 1, 2013.

Governor Hickenlooper signed a bill permitting joint state income tax filing for civil partners and out-of-state same-sex married couples.

On February 19, 2014, nine same-sex couples, some unmarried and some married in other jurisdictions, filed a lawsuit in state court challenging the state's definition of marriage and arguing that civil unions created a "second-class level of citizenship" for gays and lesbians. The suit, McDaniel-Miccio v. Hickenlooper, named Governor Hickenlooper and the Denver City Clerk as defendants. The clerk expressed support for same-sex marriage. Attorney General John Suthers, a Republican, announced he would defend the state's definition of marriage. On October 6, Suthers asked the Tenth Circuit to dismiss his appeal and lift the stay after the U.S. Supreme Court left in place as binding precedent other Tenth Circuit decisions holding bans on same-sex marriage unconstitutional in Oklahoma and Utah. Same-sex marriage became legal on October 7, 2014 after the Colorado Supreme Court lifted the last legal barriers and Attorney General John Suthers told clerks around the state to begin issuing licenses.

In January 2021, the Colorado Supreme Court ruled that the state must retroactively recognize common-law same-sex marriages that occurred prior to legalization in 2014.

Adoption and parenting
A single LGBT person and same-sex couples can petition to adopt in Colorado. Second-parent adoptions are permitted under state law, though the process is more elaborate and expensive than that required of married couples.

Lesbian couples can access assisted reproduction services, such as in vitro fertilization. State law recognizes the non-genetic, non-gestational mother as a legal parent to a child born via donor insemination, but only if the parents are married. While there are no specific surrogacy laws in Colorado, the courts have ruled that the practice is legal and surrogacy contracts can be recognized as legally valid. Both gestational and traditional contracts are recognized, though the latter may result in potential legal conflicts and more litigation than the former. The state treats different-sex and same-sex couples equally under the same terms and conditions.

Several Catholic adoption agencies do not place children either with single persons or with same-sex couples.

On May 20, 2022, Governor Jared Polis signed "Marlo's Law," a bill to reform adoption and parentage laws that apply to children conceived through IVF. Non-gestational parents still have to adopt their own children, even when they are biologically related to the child and married to a legal parent, but the process has become simpler. The bill had passed both houses of the Colorado General Assembly with amendments to specify that it doesn't apply to children conceived through surrogacy.

Discrimination protections

It has been illegal to discriminate on the basis of sexual orientation and gender identity or expression in employment, housing, public accommodations, education, and credit since the category "sexual orientation" was added to the state's anti-discrimination law in 2008. The bill was controversial and following its passage by the General Assembly opponents waged a media campaign that failed to persuade Governor Bill Ritter to withhold his signature. State statutes define "sexual orientation" as "an individual's orientation toward heterosexuality, homosexuality, bisexuality, or transgender status or another individual's perception thereof."

Moreover, the state's anti-bullying law prohibits bullying on the basis of disability, race, creed, color, sex, sexual orientation, gender identity, national origin, religion, ancestry, or need for special education services. The law, which also includes cyberbullying, applies to all school districts, and requires them to "adopt a safe school plan and conduct and discipline code that contains a specific policy addressing bullying prevention and education", including regular surveys of students' impression, character building, the designation of a team of persons at each school to advise the school administration concerning the severity and frequency of bullying incidents, and requirements for how the conduct and discipline code must by publicized.

On November 3, 1992, Colorado voters approved Initiative 2, an initiated constitutional amendment, which added language to the State Constitution that prohibited the state and all of its subdivisions from allowing "homosexual, lesbian or bisexual orientation, conduct, practices or relationships" to provide the basis for any "claim any minority status, quota preferences, protected status or claim of discrimination." In 1994, the Colorado Supreme Court found the amendment unconstitutional. In 1996, the U.S. Supreme Court held in Romer v. Evans that the amendment, because it "allows discrimination against homosexuals and prevents the state from protecting them", was "motivated by animus towards homosexuals" and violated their rights under the equal protection clause of the Fourteenth Amendment.

In June 2012, a gay couple who had married in Massachusetts tried to purchase a wedding cake at a bakery in Lakewood, and were refused. They sued to force the bakery to provide them with the same services as other customers, and on December 6 Administrative Law Judge Robert N. Spencer ruled for the plaintiffs in Craig v. Masterpiece Cakeshop. He dismissed the bakery's claim that requiring the business to provide the service violated its owner's rights to free speech or religious expression. In June 2018, this ruling was thrown out by the U.S. Supreme Court on a 7 to 2 ruling in favor of the defendant, in Masterpiece Cakeshop v. Colorado Civil Rights Commission.

In July 2021, Colorado implemented strong legislation a first for the United States - to explicitly ban both sexual orientation and gender identity biased algorithms within high-tech companies and industries.

In December 2022, SCOTUS decided it would "take up the case" under the First Amendment and hear arguments of a Colorado website designer - that discriminates, opposes and refuses to serve individuals within same-sex marriages.

Hate crime law
The state's hate crime law has provided protections based on both sexual orientation and gender identity or expression since 2001. In 2009, in a case thought to be "the first in which a hate crime law was applied in a murder trial where the victim was transgender", a jury in Greeley convicted a man of first-degree murder and found that it was a hate crime under Colorado law. The law provides penalty enhancements if a crime is motivated by the victim's actual or perceived sexual orientation or gender identity, amongst other categories.

In November 2022, in Colorado Springs a mass shooting at a gay bar occurred. The Governor ordered all flags within Colorado to be a lowered. The headquarters of Focus on the Family an anti-gay hate group since 1977, is based in Colorado Springs. Up until the 1990s, Colorado was informally well known as "the hate state". Two patrons at the establishment prevented more lives from being taken or lost, by stopping the gunman immediately. The shooter is the grandson of a high-profile Californian Republican lawmaker it was reported - "who has extreme and out there views on various social, economic and political issues".

It was reported within Colorado, that hate crimes on individuals based on sexual orientation alone have increased by 380% since 2018.

In December 2022, it was reported that Colorado Police have charged the gay bar shooter and perpetrator within Colorado Springs is facing 305 charges and ongoing court trials. The FBI law enforcement Colorado team is also investigating all the websites as well (both visited and created) by the perpetrators (himself and possibly others) - in the connection to the shootings at Colorado Springs.

Transgender rights

Between January 1, 1984 to February 13, 2019, changing the gender marker on a birth certificate required undergoing sex reassignment surgery. In February 2019, the requirement to undertake such procedures was removed by a unanimous vote by the board of the Colorado Department of Public Health and Environment. The applicant for a gender change can simply do so by request, to the Division of Motor Vehicles (by completing a "Change of Sex Designation" form) if the change concerns a driver's license or a state ID, or to the Department of Health (by completing a "Birth Certificate Correction Form" and a "Sex Designation Form") if the change concerns a birth certificate. Minors are also permitted to change legal gender, but require the consent of a parent or guardian and a medical or mental health professional.

Birth certificates have four sex descriptor; "M" (male), "F" (female), "Intersex" and "X". State IDs and driver's licenses have three descriptor; male, female and X.

In October 2021, it was announced that beginning in 2023, basic health insurance coverage within Colorado must legally and explicitly include sexual reassignment surgery as a human right for individuals as a basic policy — a legal first for the United States.

Conversion therapy

On March 10, 2015, the Colorado House of Representatives approved 35–29 a bill banning sexual orientation change efforts (conversion therapy) with minors. However, the bill failed to pass the Colorado Senate.

On March 17, 2016, the House voted 35–29 in favor of a bill sponsored by Representative Dominick Moreno which would have outlawed the use of conversion therapy on LGBT minors. The bill was postponed indefinitely in a Senate committee in a 3–2 vote on April 11, 2016.

In March 2017, the Colorado House of Representatives passed for the third time a ban on conversion therapy on minors, but got blocked for the third time in three years in the Colorado Senate.

In December 2018, Denver introduced an ordinance banning conversion therapy on LGBT minors. The proposal passed council committee and floor votes unanimously by a vote of 13–0 on January 7, 2019. The ordinance took effect immediately after signature from Mayor Michael Hancock a week later. Denver became the first jurisdiction in the state to implement a ban on conversion therapy on LGBT minors.

On February 19, 2019, the House passed a bill to ban the use conversion therapy on minors, with a 42–19 majority. The Senate approved the bill on March 25 with a 21–13 majority. The bill was amended in the Senate, and sent back to the House for another vote, which voted in favor of the amended version. On May 31, 2019, Governor Jared Polis, the United States' first openly gay governor, signed the bill into law. Colorado became the 17th U.S. state (plus the District of Columbia) to ban the use of the discredited practice on minors.

Gay panic defense
In June 2020, the Colorado General Assembly passed a bipartisan bill to abolish the gay panic defense. In July 2020, the bill was signed into law by Governor Jared Polis, and went into effect immediately.

Veteran benefits
In April 2021, the Colorado General Assembly passed a bill, by a vote of 47–16 in the House and 34–0 in the Senate, to restore benefits to LGBT veterans who had received a dishonorable discharge under Don't Ask, Don't Tell. Governor Jared Polis signed the bill into law on April 19, 2021.

Freedom of expression
In February 2021, a gay man filed a lawsuit in federal district court against his metropolitan district's rules banning rainbow flags. The American Civil Liberties Union argues the rules breach the First Amendment of the United States Constitution. In March 2021, a federal district court ordered that the city stop enforcing the rule which prohibited the Pride flag.

In July 2021, the United States Court of Appeals for the Tenth Circuit dismissed a case from a web designer who refused to offer her services to same-sex couples and originally started the lawsuit in Denver. In February 2022, it was formally announced that the Christian web designer case would have  gone straight to the Supreme Court of the United States.

Public opinion
A 2017 Public Religion Research Institute poll found that 71% of Colorado residents supported same-sex marriage, while 21% were opposed and 8% were unsure.

Summary table

See also

Politics of Colorado
LGBT rights in the United States
Same-sex marriage in the Tenth Circuit

References

LGBT rights in Colorado